Michael Meagher (27 February 1846 – December 1927) was an Irish nationalist politician. A member of the Irish Parliamentary Party, he was elected Member of Parliament for North Kilkenny at a by-election in 1906, and held the seat until the 1918 general election.

References

External links 
 

1846 births
1927 deaths
Members of the Parliament of the United Kingdom for County Kilkenny constituencies (1801–1922)
UK MPs 1906–1910
UK MPs 1910
UK MPs 1910–1918
Irish Parliamentary Party MPs